Senator Brewster may refer to:

Daniel Brewster (1923–2007), U.S. Senator from Maryland from 1963 to 1969
Jim Brewster (fl. 2010s), Pennsylvania State Senate
Owen Brewster (1888–1961), U.S. Senator from Maine from 1941 to 1952